The Dort, or Dort or Dordrecht: The Dort packet-boat from Rotterdam becalmed is an 1818 painting by J. M. W. Turner, based on drawings made by him in mid September 1817. It shows a view of the harbour of Dordrecht. It is the finest example of the influence of Dutch marine painting on Turner's work.

It was exhibited at the Royal Academy in 1818, where it was described by The Morning Chronicle as "one of the most magnificent pictures ever exhibited, and does honour to the age". In 1832, John Constable wrote of the picture, "I remember most of Turner's early works; amongst them one of singular intricacy and beauty; it was a canal with numerous boats making thousands of beautiful shapes, and I think the most complete work of a genius I ever saw".

It was purchased by Walter Fawkes for 500 guineas at the request of his son, and hung in the drawing room at Farnley Hall until it was bought by Paul Mellon in 1966. It was then donated to the Yale Center for British Art upon the founding of the centre.

References

Paintings by J. M. W. Turner
1818 paintings
Paintings in the Yale Center for British Art
Maritime paintings